HMS Invincible was a Royal Navy  ironclad battleship. She was built at the Napier shipyard and completed in 1870. Completed just 10 years after , she still carried sails as well as a steam engine.

Armament
The Audacious class was armed with ten  muzzle-loading guns, supported by four  muzzle loaders. These were located in a broadside pattern over a  two-deck battery amidships—this was the area of the ship least affected by its motion, and made for a very stable gun platform.

Early career

For the first year of her career, she was a guardship at Hull, before being replaced by her sister . She was then transferred to the Mediterranean, where she served until 1886. She was sent to Cadiz in 1873 to prevent ships seized by republicans during the civil war in Spain from leaving harbour. She rejoined the Mediterranean Fleet in 1878 under the command of Captain Lindsay Brine, but her poor state of seamanship attracted the ire of the commander-in-chief, Geoffrey Hornby. In early 1879 Invincible blundered badly, putting two ships at hazard, and Brine was court-martialled. Though acquitted, Brine was relieved by Captain Edmund Fremantle. In August 1880, Invincible discovered the dismasted and abandoned Austro-Hungarian barque George Roscovich off Sardinia, Italy. She towed the barque in to Palermo, Sicily, Italy on 5 August. Invincible was Admiral Seymour's temporary flagship at the 1882 bombardment of Alexandria because his normal one, drew too much to enter the inner harbour. She provided men for the naval brigade that was subsequently landed and she also provided men for Charles Beresford's naval brigade in the Sudan campaign of 1885.

Later career and shipwreck
She made a trip to China in 1886 to carry out a new crew for Audacious before becoming the guardship at Southampton until 1893. Her engines were removed in 1901 when she became a depot ship at Sheerness for a destroyer flotilla. She was renamed HMS Erebus in 1904, a name that she bore until 1906, when she was converted into a training ship at Portsmouth for engineering artificers and was renamed Fisgard II (Audacious had been renamed Fisgard in 1904).

On 17 September 1914, she sank during a storm off Portland Bill with the loss of 21 of her crew of 64.

HMS Fisgard II is a Designated vessel under schedule 1 of The Protection of Military Remains Act 1986 (Designation of Vessels and Controlled Sites) Order 2012.

References

Publications

 

 

 

 

Audacious-class ironclads
Victorian-era battleships of the United Kingdom
Shipwrecks in the English Channel
Maritime incidents in September 1914
1869 ships